Estadio Francisco Artes Carrasco is a multi-use stadium in Lorca, Spain.  It is currently used mostly for football matches and is the former home ground of Lorca Deportiva CF. It is the home ground of two clubs, Lorca FC and CF Lorca Deportiva. The stadium holds 8,120.

History
The stadium was inaugurated on 5 March 2003, with a friendly match between FC Barcelona and Lorca Deportiva CF that finished 1–4 for the Catalans.

On 14 October 2008, it hosted a Spain under-21 team official match.

The stadium was used as a hospital after the 2011 Lorca earthquake.

Gallery

References

External links
Estadios de España 

Francisco Artes Carrasco
Lorca Deportiva CF
Lorca FC
Lorca, Spain
Sports venues completed in 2003